is a city located in Ōita Prefecture, Japan that was founded on December 11, 1940. It is an agricultural and industrial centre that primarily produces lumber, furniture, and pottery. Its attractions and scenic beauty also make it a popular tourist destination.

On March 22, 2005, the towns of Amagase and Ōyama, and the villages of Kamitsue, Maetsue and Nakatsue (all from Hita District) were merged into Hita.

As of December 31, 2019, Hita has a population of 64,874.

Geography
Hita is located in the far west of Ōita Prefecture, and borders the neighboring prefectures of Fukuoka and Kumamoto.  Surrounding cities include Kurume to the west, Nakatsu to the north, and Kusu to the east. Hita is a natural basin surrounded by mountains, with several rivers that eventually become the Chikugo River. Due to this connection, although Hita is placed within Ōita Prefecture, it shares a historical connection to Fukuoka Prefecture. The dialect used in Hita has characteristics of the Hichiku dialect used in Fukuoka, Nagasaki, and Saga Prefectures.

Many rivers that run through Hita join up to the Mikuma River, and later the Chikugo River. These rivers were used to distribute lumber to Kurume and Ōkawa at the end of the Edo Period, but with the completion of the Yoake Dam, the use of this route stopped.

The mountains surrounding the Hita basin reach 1000 meters (3,281 ft) above sea level, while some mountains around Nakatsue, Maetsue, and Kamitsue reach 1200 meters (3,937 ft) above sea level.

Surronding municipalities 
Ōita Prefecture

 Nakatsu
 Kusu

Kumamoto Prefecture

 Kikuchi
 Yamaga
 Aso
 Oguni
 Minamioguni

Fukuoka Prefecture

 Yame
 Asakura
 Ukiha
 Soeda
Tōhō

Climate

Hita has a humid subtropical climate (Köppen climate classification Cfa). As a basin, the change in temperature from day to night during summer and winter is steep. Hita has a high annual precipitation rate, with over one third of the rain falling during the rainy season months of June and July. Heavy rainfall is frequent, and severe flood damage has occurred in the past. From spring to autumn, a deep fog known locally as sokogiri (底霧, shallow ground fog) often appears in the morning.

Summer gets very hot, with temperatures often rising above , while winter gets notably cold. At times the temperature falls to -5 ℃ (23 °F). Hita gets more snow than average for Ōita Prefecture.

In the Maetsue mountain area the precipitation rate is high. While this helps grow the Japanese cedar and Japanese cypress trees used in the forestry industry, it also causes landslides.

Towns and villages
Towns and villages of note that lie within Hita's boundaries include:
Amagase: Popular hot-spring spa town
Maetsue: Mountain village
Nakatsue: Mountain village
Kamitsue: Home to international racing circuit Autopolis
Ōyama: Agricultural town famous for ume and mushrooms
Onta: Scenic pottery village producing distinct Japanese pottery called Onta ware (Onta-yaki)

For the municipal timeline of Hita, see Hita District (Japanese). Hita has shared borders with the former Hita District since 1889.

Demographics
Per Japanese census data, the population of Hita in 2020 is 62,657 people. Hita has been conducting censuses since 1920.

History
In 1593, Hita came under the direct control of the Toyotomi Household as the main city overseeing Kyushu. After the completion of Hinokuma castle and fortification of Nagayama castle, Hita passed from the Toyotomi household to the new daimyō Tokugawa Ieyasu and became a "Tenryo" town, in which the town was under direct control of the Tokugawa Shogunate. After the Meiji period it was known as Hita Prefecture, and after that, it was assimilated into Ōita Prefecture.

Economy

Traditional crafts

Wooden geta, made from the trees surrounding Hita
Onta ware, pottery created in the mountain village of Onta

Industry
Forestry has long flourished in Hita due to the abundant tree supply in the surrounding mountains. Japanese cedar trees called "Hita Cedar" are used to make geta and lacquerware. In recent years the forest industry has declined as a result of the importation of cheap foreign lumber.

From the 1960s, after large areas of cultivated land became difficult to obtain, agriculture in Hita has been shifting its focus from rice to crops grown in the mountains, such as ume, Japanese chestnuts, and mushrooms.

A fishing industry is present, with ayu and other fish captured in the Mikuma River.

Hita is well-known for its high quality water. Hita Tenryosui produces mineral water, and many distilleries produce sake and shōchū.

Recently, companies such as TDK, Kyushu Sumidenso, Sapporo Breweries, and Sanwa Shurui have expanded manufacturing in the area.

Culture

Tourism 
During the Edo period, Hita was modeled after Kyoto and its merchant culture, and even now is nicknamed "Little Kyoto". Traces of old Kyoto are apparent in the streets of Mameda-machi (豆田町), a town where buildings of the time period have been preserved. Prominent buildings include the Hirose Museum (廣瀬資料館), the Kusano House (草野本家), the Nihongan Medicine Museum (日本丸館), and the Tenryō Hita Museum (天領日田資料館). There is also the Kuncho Shuzō Sake Brewery (薫長酒蔵資料館), which has a museum and shop.

Kangien (咸宜園跡) was a private school built by Hirose Tansō in 1805. The school's name means "everyone is welcome," and students from all over Japan came to study in Hita, regardless of age, gender, or social status. Kangien has been designated as a Japan Heritage site and two buildings remain standing: Shūfūan (秋風庵) and Enshirō (遠思楼). An education research center has also been built at the site.

Taio gold mine is located in Nakatsue village; the mine was in operation from 1898 to 1972, but now remains as a museum.

From July to November, fishermen erect bamboo fish traps in the Mikuma River to capture ayu fish, which are covered in salt and grilled.

Hita has many onsen hot springs, particularly along the Mikuma River and in Amagase.

There are also many shrines, temples, and parks located throughout the city.

Festivals
Hita has many festivals throughout the year that attract a steady stream of visitors.

Tenryō Hita Ohina Festival

Tenryō Hita Ohina Festival (天領日田おひなまつり) is a girl's doll festival held every year from February 15 through March 31, around the time of the national Hinamatsuri. During this festival, the museums and old houses of Mameda-machi and Kuma-machi open their doors to the public and display their collection of dolls.

Hita Kawabiraki Kankōsai River Opening Festival

Hita Kawabiraki Kankōsai (日田川開き観光祭), or River Opening Festival, is held the first weekend after May 20. This festival celebrates the start of the ayu fishing season on Mikuma River, and more than 10,000 fireworks are launched over the river in a two-day firework display.

Hita Gion Festival

Hita Gion Festival (日田祇園祭) is held the first weekend after July 20. It is modeled after the famous Gion Festival in Kyoto. Huge wooden yamaboko floats (up to 12m high) from different areas of the city are pushed around the streets by volunteers. These floats can also be seen at the Gion Yamaboko Hall (日田祇園山鉾会館) in Kuma-machi throughout the year.

Sen-nen Akari Bamboo Light Festival

Sen-nen Akari (千年あかり) is held from Friday to Sunday during the third week in November. On these three nights, bamboo lights illuminate the streets of Mameda-machi and the neighboring Kagestu River. The festival began in 2005.

Hita Tenryō Festival

Hita Tenryō Festival (日田天領まつり) is held the third weekend in November. This festival celebrates Hita's Edo period, when it was under direct Tokugawa supervision. The highlight is a procession of 200 people through the city in full Edo-period costume. The name of the festival comes from the phrase tenryō, used to describe such direct Tokugawa landholdings (Hita was part of the territory overseen by the saigoku gundai, the deputy of the western provinces).

Cuisine 
Hita has many local specialty foods. One of the most famous is Hita Yakisoba, a noodle dish prepared in a unique manner that makes it crispier than standard yakisoba. Takanazushi is a kind of sushi made with takana (a leaf mustard) and nori. The seasoning yuzukoshō is theorized to have been first made in Hita.

Transportation
The principal railway station is Hita Station, with JR Kyushu running two lines through the city: the Kyūdai Main Line and the Hitahikosan Line. As a result of the July 2017 Northern Kyushu heavy rain damage, rail service on the Hitahikosan Line has been suspended between Hita and Soeda, running a replacement bus instead.

The luxury Aru Ressha train was designed by Eiji Mitooka. It runs between Ōita and Hita and is in service to also revive tourism and the local economy.

There are three main bus companies servicing Hita: Hita Bus, Nishitetsu, and Ōita Transportation. The Ōita Expressway passes through Hita, and highway buses connect Hita to Fukuoka, Ōita, and Nagasaki. Other routes connect Hita to neighboring regions, and a community bus provides service within the city.

Notable people 

 Hajime Isayama (manga artist and writer)
 Hirose Tansō (scholar and writer)
 Junko Maya (actress)
 Keisuke Kimoto (Football player)
 Koji Kuramoto (judo athlete)
 Sayami Matsushita (archer)

References

External links

 Hita City official website 
Hita City official sightseeing information site

Cities in Ōita Prefecture
Hanami spots of Japan